This is a list of Colombian television series, television programs, contests and general TV shows.

Animation
El siguiente programa (1997, Cenpro TV)

Anthology series
El cuento del domingo (1980–1993, RTI Producciones)

Children
Animalandia
Bichos Bichez
Buscando Amigos
Chiz Garabiz
Club 10
Cumpleaños Ramo
De Pies a Cabeza
Descubro mi mundo
Imagínate (1987, Producciones PUNCH)
Jack el Despertador
La Brújula Mágica
La Libélula Dorada
Llegaron los Monachos
Los Dumis
Maxi mini TV
Notti Tutti Cuanti
Oki Doki (1992–1997, RCN TV)
Pequeños gigantes (1983, Caracol Televisión)
Siempre Juntos
Tú lo conoces, tú lo construyes
Verde Manzana
Zoológico ecológico
Sabor a Limon

Comedy
Caballo viejo (1988, Caracol Televisión)
Caleroscopio (2006)
Casados con Hijos (2005–2006)
Cazados (1995, Producciones PUNCH)
Chispazos (1987–1993, Producciones Cinevisión)
Clon Estilo
Dejémonos de Vainas
Don Chinche (1983–1990, RTI Producciones)
El Siguiente Programa
La Banda
La Diva (2006)
La posada (1987–1992, TeVecine)
La Tele
Las Señoritas Gutiérrez
Los Francotiradores
Los Pérez Somos Así
Leche (1995–1996, Caracol Televisión)
N.N. (1990–1995, Colombiana de Televisión)
No me lo Cambie
Noticiero Quack
O todos en la cama (1997, RCN TV)
Pido la Parola
¿Quién Manda a Quien? (2006)
Romeo y buseta (1988–1992, TeVecine)
Sábados Felices (1972–present)
Sabor a limón (1995, RCN TV)
Shampoo
Si nos dejan (1991, Producciones PUNCH)
También Caeras (1999–present)
Te quiero pecas (1988, RCN TV)
Todos en la Cama
Vuelo secreto (1991–1999, Producciones PUNCH)
Yo y Tú (1956–1976; 1982; 1985)
Zoociedad

Contests/Game shows
¿Cuánto Sabe? Punch le Paga
¿Cuánto Vale su Actuación?
¿Quiere Cacao?
20.000 por su Respuesta (1968)
Alcance la Estrella
Cabeza y Cola
Cante y Gane
Cazadores de la Fortuna (1994)
Cien Colombianos Dicen
Componga
Compre la Orquesta
Concéntrese (1968; 1986)
Conteste y Dana le Paga (1958)
Dígalo Cantando (2007)
Do Re Millones: La Orquesta de la fortuna
D1 (2006)
El Jugador (2007)
El Poder del 10 (2008)
El Programa del Millón
Gánele al Reloj con Philips
Golazo Fruco (1969)
Guerra de Estrellas
Los Tres a las 6
Miles de Pesos por sus Respuestas
Nada más que la Verdad (2007)
Nescafé paga las Letras (1958)
Reina por un Día (1969)
Respuesta al Desafio
Sabariedades
Sabes más que un Niño de Primaria (2008)
Telectronico
El Precio es Correcto
Quién Quiere ser Millonario?

Cultural
Carta de Colombia
Cinearte
Conozca a los Autores
Correo Especial
El Juicio
El Mundo al Vuelo
El Pasado en Presente
Esta es su Vida (1954)
Maestros
Mares y Marinos de Colombia
Naturalia
Vida del siglo XX
Yo Sé Quién Sabe lo que Usted no Sabe

Drama
Amas de casa desesperadas (2007)
Así Es La Vida (RCN, Univision)
Así Fue
Crónicas de una generación trágica (1993, TeVecine, Canal Uno)
Decisiones (1990; 2006)
Dialogando (1972–1989)
Este es mi Caso
Francisco el Matemático (1998–2004)
Hombres (1996, RCN TV)
Juego Limpio (2006)
La vorágine (1975, RCN TV)
Padres e Hijos (1993–2009)
Pandillas, guerra y paz 2 (2009–2010, Fox Telecolombia)
Pandillas, guerra y paz (1998–2002, Fox Telecolombia)
Puerta grande (1992, RCN TV)
Simón el mago (1992, Víctor Gaviria)
Sueños y espejos (1995, Coestrellas)
Teatro Popular Caracol
Vendaval (1974)
Vuelo 15.03 (2006)

Entertainment
Blanca y Pura
CineArte
Circo Romano
Día a Día
Doble vía
El Club de la Television
El Lavadero
El Mundo Según Pirry
El Show de Jimmy
El Show de las Estrellas
Esta Noche Sí
Estilo RCN
Estudio 15
EstudioUno
Los Cuentos De Diva: El Programa
Lucho y su Gloria
Muy Buenos Días
Noches de Colombia
Panorama
Sweet, el dulce sabor del chisme
Telehipódromo
Tu tele
Yo, José Gabriel

Musical
Quieta Margarita (1988, Caracol Televisión)

Mystery
Los cuervos (1984–1986, RTI Producciones)

News
24 Horas
CityNoticias
Contrapunto
Noticiero TV Hoy
El radar
Noticias CM&
Noticias Caracol
Noticias RCN
Noticias Uno
Noticiero Criptón
Noticiero Grafico (1954)
Noticiero Nacional
Noticiero Suramericana
Noticiero de las 7
QAP Noticias
Reportero Esso (1956)
Séptimo día
Telediario con Arturo Abella

Reality Shows
El Triángulo (2003)
Colombia tiene talento (2012)
La Bella y el Nerdo (2006)
Gran Hermano (2003)
Bogotá Real
La Isla de los Famosos (2004)
Bailando por un Sueño (2005–2006)
Desafío (2004–present)
El Huésped (2003)
Estrella Azul
El Gran Partido (2004–2005)
La Granja Tolima (2004)
Nómadas (2005)
Popstars
Protagonistas de Novela (2002)
Protagonistas de Nuestra Tele (2012)
Se Busca (2003)
Expedición Robinson (2001–2002)
Tengo una Ilusión (2005–2006)
El Aprendiz (2005)
El factor X (2005–present)
Los Reyes de la Pista (2006)
Yo me llamo (2011–2012)

Sitcom
Dejémonos de vainas (1984–1998, Coestrellas, [)

Sports
Cabalgata Deportiva Gillette
Campeones en Acción (1964)
Fútbol, el Mejor Espectáculo del Mundo (1982)
Fuera de Lugar
Futbolmania RCN
Gol Caracol
La Telepolémica
Lunes Deportivo
Momentos Mágicos del Deporte (1964)
Noticiero Deportivo León (1963)
Noticiero Deportivo
Reportero Deportivo Cauchosol (1963)
Tribuna Caliente

Pasión de gavilanes

Youth-oriented
Clase aparte (1994-1995, RTI Producciones, Cenpro TV)
Conjunto cerrado (1996, RTI Producciones)
De pies a cabeza (1993, Cenpro TV)
Décimo grado (1985–1989, Cenpro TV)
Padres e hijos (1993–2009, Caracol Televisión, Colombiana de Televisión)
Sin límites (1998, Caracol Televisión)

See also
List of Colombian telenovelas
Cinema of Colombia
Culture of Colombia
Colombian comedy

 
Colombia